Bungil is a locality in the Maranoa Region, Queensland, Australia.

Geography 
The western boundary of the locality roughly follows Bungil Creek, while the Warrego Highway and Western railway line form part of the northern boundary. Bungeworgorai Creek flows through the locality from the northwest (Bungeworgorai) to the south-east becoming a tributary of Bungil Creek in neighbouring Tingun.

The land is predominantly developed for cattle grazing.

History 
The locality takes its name from the parish, which is believed to be an Aboriginal word "boo-nga-gill" where "boo" means grass, "nga" means with and "gill" means water.

Heritage listings 
Bungil has a number of heritage-listed sites, including:

 Warrego Highway: Mount Abundance Homestead

Education 
There are no schools in the locality. The nearest primary and secondary school is Roma State College in Roma to the north-east.

References 

Maranoa Region
Localities in Queensland